Hej is a village in Jörns socken in the north-west part of Skellefteå Municipality, Västerbotten County, Sweden.

The word Hej is the most common greeting in the Swedish language, and the equivalent of 'hi' in English. The village got its name in the 19th century when a surveyor played with the childish rhyme Snipp, snapp, snorum, hej basalorum. Snipp, Snapp, Snorum and Basalorum are four other villages in the vicinity.

Hej has a flea market and barn dance.

References

Villages in Sweden
Populated places in Västerbotten County